Ameya Vaidyanathan (born 29 July 1996 in Pune) is a racing driver from India. He last competed in the Japanese Formula 3 Championship for B-Max Racing with Motopark.

He is best known for his involvement in a serious crash at a Formula 3 meeting at the Norisring in 2018 involving Daniel Ticktum.

Racing Record

Career summary

Complete MSA Formula results 
(key) (Races in bold indicate pole position; races in italics indicate fastest lap)

Complete Toyota Racing Series results 
(key) (Races in bold indicate pole position) (Races in italics indicate fastest lap)

Complete FIA Formula 3 European Championship results 
(key) (Races in bold indicate pole position) (Races in italics indicate fastest lap)

Complete Japanese Formula 3 Championship results 
(key) (Races in bold indicate pole position) (Races in italics indicate fastest lap)

References

Indian racing drivers
1996 births
Living people
Carlin racing drivers
Formula Renault 2.0 NEC drivers
BRDC British Formula 3 Championship drivers
Euroformula Open Championship drivers
Toyota Racing Series drivers
Japanese Formula 3 Championship drivers
FIA Formula 3 European Championship drivers
Motopark Academy drivers
British F4 Championship drivers
Sportspeople from Pune
B-Max Racing drivers